Shur Hayat (also Romanized as Shūr Ḩayāt) is a village in Gorganbuy Rural District, in the Central District of Aqqala County, Golestan Province, Iran. At the 2006 census, its population was 795, in 167 families.

References 

Populated places in Aqqala County